A Better Tomorrow III: Love & Death in Saigon is a 1989 Hong Kong action drama film co-produced and directed by Tsui Hark. It is a loosely based prequel to John Woo's A Better Tomorrow and A Better Tomorrow II.

The film was directed by Tsui Hark, the producer behind the first two films in the series. John Woo wrote a screenplay for a third installment, but he never got to direct it due to having had artistic differences with Tsui during the filming of the second film. Instead, the original screenplay later became Bullet in the Head. The two films have many parallels, most notably, both being set in the Vietnam War.

The film stars Chow Yun-fat, who reprises his role of Mark Gor from the first film, Tony Leung Ka-fai and Anita Mui. Set during the Vietnam War, it sets up the story of how Mark became the character he was in the original film. The second part of the title Love & Death in Saigon (夕陽之歌 or Song of the Setting Sun in Chinese) is also the title song for this movie, sung by Anita Mui, who was also the leading lady in this third installment.

Plot
In 1974, during the final days of the Vietnam War, Mark Lee arrives in Saigon, intending to bring his uncle and cousin Michael Cheung Chi-mun back to Hong Kong with him. After arriving at the airport, Mark is confined by corrupt security guards who strip and attempt to rob him, but he is saved by Chow Ying-kit, who seems to have some measure of influence.

Mark and Michael later encounter Kit in a nightclub where they learn of her criminal activities including gun running. Kit takes an interest in the cousins and invites them to accompany her on a deal with a local Vietnamese warlord. The deal sours but the three escape. Kit is impressed with how Mark and Michael handled themselves and helps them escape Vietnam, taking them under her wing.

Over the next few months, Kit trains the cousins in her business and in marksmanship. Mark and Michael develop an attraction to her while Kit is attracted to Mark. Despite his feelings, Mark does not reciprocate Kit's affections to avoid hurting Michael, who thinks Kit is in love with him.

Kit manages to secure safe passage for Mark, Michael, and Michael's father back to Hong Kong. The three return and start a new business there.

The leader of the arms smuggling company (and Kit's former lover), Sam Ho Cheung-ching, returns after a three-year absence when he was presumed dead. Jealous of Kit's relationship with Mark and Michael, he plots to kill the cousins. Ho sends a bomb to the business, which kills Michael's father. Ho and his men capture Mark and Michael; they severely beat them with Ho warning them to stay away from Kit.

Kit expresses her regret for Michael's father's death and to share her feelings with Mark, which he reciprocates. Ho returns to Vietnam, taking Kit with him, to complete the deal with the Vietnamese warlord encountered earlier in the film.

Mark and Michael follow Ho back to Saigon, intending to kill him. Mark steps off the plane attired in his iconic outfit as seen in A Better Tomorrow: black duster, sunglasses, and matchstick in his mouth.

Kit later meets Michael in an abandoned temple to give him two plane tickets to leave Saigon with Mark. However, they are unexpectedly swarmed by Việt Cộng troops who attempt to execute them. Pat, a soldier and friend of Mark and Michael, strays into the temple which triggers a firefight with the Viet Cong. Michael is shot but is able to escape with Kit and Pat onto a jeep. During the ride however, Michael falls off and is surrounded by the Viet Cong which forces Pat and Kit to use a mortar that lands too close to Michael.

Believing Michael to be dead, Mark confronts Kit in her hotel room and accuses her of betrayal and keeping secrets from him. Their spat becomes physical with Michael hitting her and telling her he wants nothing to do with her before leaving. Later, Mark is met by Pat who takes him to an ambulance where Michael had been recovering.

Meanwhile, a despondent Kit prepares a bomb that she plans to detonate during her planned meeting with Ho and the Vietnamese warlord. During the meeting, however, the warlord attempts to double-cross Ho leading to a shoot-out. When the gun battle dies down, Mark arrives dual wielding two M-16 rifles, intending to exact revenge on Ho. Another shoot-out ensues, this time between Ho and Mark, during which Kit is shot by one of Ho's henchmen. Ho, however, is furious that Kit had become collateral and shoots his henchman. Ho prepares to execute Mark only to be shot by the warlord firing from a window. Mark catches Ho and uses his gun to shoot back at the warlord; Mark then cradles Ho who dies in his arms.

Pat and Michael arrive in the same ambulance to help Mark escape with the wounded Kit. The four are pursued by the warlord in an M48 Patton tank but Mark manages to destroy the tank with mortars, killing the warlord.

Mark and Michael then rush a dying Kit to the US Embassy in Saigon, where a mass evacuation is on-going as a result of the Fall of Saigon. Showing Kit's travel pass to the guards, the three are granted passage on the last US helicopter leaving the embassy which lifts off just as the crowds rush through the gates and the North Vietnamese flag is raised.

Kit succumbs to her injuries. Mark cradles her dead body and contemplates his life ahead as the helicopter flies off into the sunset.

Cast

Box office
The film grossed HK$18,476,116 at the Hong Kong box office.

Alternative versions
The Taiwan version runs 145 minutes long, which is the complete uncut version. The Hong Kong version runs only 114 minutes long despite saying 130 minutes on the cover. On a special 2004 DVD release, there are a few minutes of scenes that were deleted from the Hong Kong version as a separate feature. A Chinese out-of-print DVD dubbed from Taiwan (but actually published in China) runs 130 minutes long, which is the extended version, which is shorter compared to the Taiwanese out-of-print 145-minute VCD. A Taiwan Long Shong VHS dubbed in Taiwan (and distributed from Taiwan) contains an alternate scene in which Anita kisses Tony Leung's hand and is also shorter than the 145-minute Taiwan VCD.

Year-end list
 10th – Stephen Hunter, The Baltimore Sun

References

External links
 
 
 
 
 A Better Tomorrow 3 at chinesemov.com

1989 films
1980s action drama films
Hong Kong action thriller films
Hong Kong romantic drama films
Vietnam War films
Triad films
1980s Cantonese-language films
Films directed by Tsui Hark
Films shot in Vietnam
Films set in 1974
1980s action thriller films
1989 crime drama films
1989 romantic drama films
A Better Tomorrow films
Gun fu films
Films set in Saigon
1980s Hong Kong films